D. Appleton & Company was an American publishing company founded by Daniel Appleton, who opened a general store which included books. He published his first book in 1831. The company's publications gradually extended over the entire field of literature. It issued the works of contemporary scientists at moderate prices, for example, Herbert Spencer, John Tyndall, Thomas Huxley, Charles Darwin, etc. Medical books formed a special department, and books in the Spanish language for the South American market were a specialty which the firm made its own. In belles lettres and American history, it had a strong list of names among its authors.

Timeline 
 1813 Relocated from Haverhill to Boston and imported books from England
 1825 Relocated New York City and entered the book business with brother-in-law Jonathan Leavitt
 1831 Published first book: Crumbs from the Master's Table by William Mason (1719–1791)
 1848 Daniel Appleton retired; son William Henry Appleton (1814–1899) formed a partnership with his brothers, John Adams Appleton (1817–1881), George Swett Appleton (1821–1878), Daniel Sidney Appleton (1824–1890), and Samuel Francis Appleton (1826–1883)
 1849 Death of Daniel Appleton
 1857 First New York trade publisher to engage in subscription publishing
 1869 Appleton's Journal started
 1872 Popular Science Monthly magazine and International Scientific Series started by editor Edward L. Youmans
 1875 Original publication of the memoirs of General William Tecumseh Sherman, one of the first such publications by a Civil War general 
 1881 Relocated from Leonard Street and Broadway, to Bond Street, New York City; Journal becomes Appleton's Magazine
 1890 Co-founded American Book Company, a conglomerate including D. Appleton & Company
 1894 Published Songs of the Soil by Frank Lebby Stanton
 1900 Filed for bankruptcy and sold Popular Science; re-organized by Joseph H. Sears of Harper's
 1905 Appleton's Magazine renamed Appleton's Booklovers Magazine
 
 1919 J. W. Hiltman named president
 1924 Purchased Stewart and Kidd, founded in 1914
 1931 Published I Sailed with Chinese Pirates by Aleko E. Lilius
 1933 Merged with The Century Company, founded in 1881, to form the Appleton-Century Company
 1945 Sold hymn books department to Revell Publishing
 1948 Merged with F. S. Crofts Co., founded in 1924, to form Appleton-Century-Crofts.

Publishing highlights 

The Red Badge of Courage by Stephen Crane, 1895
Uncle Remus: His Songs and His Sayings by Joel Chandler Harris, 1880
Alice's Adventures in Wonderland by Lewis Carroll, 1865, first U.S. edition
Appletons' Cyclopædia of Biography in 1 volume, 1856, edited by Francis L. Hawks, added American biographies to the volume edited by Elihu Rich and published in 1854 by Richard Griffin & Company (London).
Appletons' Cyclopædia of American Biography in 6 volumes, 1887, edited by James Grant Wilson and John Fiske
Appleton's Railroad and Steamboat Guide, 1847
New American Cyclopedia in 16 volumes, edited by George Ripley and Charles Anderson Dana, 1857–1863; revised and enlarged as American Cyclopedia (1873–1876)
 Progress and Poverty 1880
 Annual Cyclopedia for the years 1861–1901, annual
Johnson's Universal Cyclopaedia 1893, in 8 volumes edited by Charles Kendall Adams. The rights were acquired from Alvin J. Johnson & Co.
Universal Cyclopaedia 1900, in 12 volumes derived from Johnson's Universal Cyclopaedia. Edited by Charles Kendall Adams, and from 1902 by Rossiter Johnson, with title Universal Cyclopaedia and Atlas
The Century Dictionary and Cyclopedia, 1889–1891, New Century Dictionary 1927–c. 1963
Picturesque America by William Cullen Bryant, 1872
Unabridged English Dictionary 1859
works of Jonathan Edwards, 1834 (1703–1758)
science works of Charles Darwin (1809–1882)
Diseases of the Heart and Arterial System, by Dr. Robert Hall Babcock (1903)
Diseases of the Lungs by Dr. Robert Hall Babcock (1907)
Memoirs of William Tecumseh Sherman (1820—1891)
The Works of Rudyard Kipling [Authorized Editions] 15 Volumes (1899)
literary works of Henry James (1843–1916)
art works of Edith Wharton (1862–1937)
architectural works of Stanford White (d. 1906)
Gems of British Art, 1857
work of Thomas Henry Huxley, 1880
From the Manger to the Throne 1880—1889 by REV. T. DeWitt Talmage, D.D.
American Negro Slavery by Ulrich Bonnell Phillips, 1918
The Rise and Fall of the Confederate Government by Jefferson Davis
A Journey in Other Worlds by John Jacob Astor

Gallery

See also 

 Appletons' Cyclopædia of American Biography
 American Cyclopædia
 Appleton's Magazine
 Appletons' travel guides

References

External links

 Appleton-Century MSS
 NYPL. Portraits of William H. Appleton, Daniel Appleton, founder, John A. Appleton, George Appleton, Daniel Sidney Appleton.
 Library of Congress. Photo, 2007. Second Floor Corridor. Printers' marks+Columns. Printer's mark of D. Appleton and Co. in North Corridor. Library of Congress Thomas Jefferson Building, Washington, D.C.
  This has information on the firm's evolution.
 Open Library. D. Appleton and Company
Finding aid to D. Appleton and Co. Correspondence at Columbia University. Rare Book & Manuscript Library.

1825 establishments in New York (state)
Publishing companies established in 1825
Defunct book publishing companies of the United States
American companies established in 1825
Appleton family